VanEnkevort Tug & Barge is an American shipping line, founded in 1967, that specializes in shipping bulk cargoes in tug barge units.

In 2018 the firm was charged with negligence over allegations an anchor dragging from one of its tugboats, the Clyde S. VanEnkevort, damaged three transmission cables and dented an oil pipeline in the Straits of Mackinac.

References

Water transportation in Michigan
Dry bulk shipping companies
Transport companies established in 1967
Great Lakes Waterway